Pacouria is a genus of flowering plants belonging to the family Apocynaceae.

Its native range is Southern Tropical America.

Species:

Pacouria boliviensis 
Pacouria guianensis

References

Apocynaceae
Apocynaceae genera